The following table compares the operating system support and basic features of various UPnP AV media servers.

See also
 List of UPnP AV media servers and clients
 Comparison of set-top boxes
 Universal Plug and Play
 Digital Living Network Alliance

Notes

References

UPnP AV MediaServers
Digital media
Media servers